Egypt Urban Forum (EUF) is an international forum about urbanization issues held in Cairo, Egypt annually under the auspices of the Ministry of Housing and Urban Communities of Egypt and the UN-Habitat. the First Egypt Urban Forum was in Cairo on June 14–16, 2015. more than 300 Egyptian institutions, decision makers, civil society representatives, scholars and experts, private sector companies and around 50 regional and international partners will be invited to the first forum to discuss issues that related to Egypt cooperation with World Urban Forum.

External links 
  Egypt Urban Forum  - official website

Politics of Egypt
Organisations based in Cairo
Urban planning